Fallguy is a 1962 American film directed by Donn Harling. The plot revolves around a teenage boy who helps an accident victim only to find himself enveloped political corruption, racketeering, and charged with a murder he did not commit.

Cast
Ed Dugan as Sonny Martin
George Mitchell as Carl Tamin
Louis Gartner as Police Chief
Don Alderette as Sam Johnson
Madeline Frances as June Johnson
Dick O'Neill

External links

1962 films
1962 crime films
American black-and-white films
American crime films
1960s English-language films
1960s American films